Deris (also Romanized as Derīs; also known as Pīr Derīz and Pīr-i-Dīriz) is a village in Deris Rural District, in the Central District of Kazerun County, Fars Province, Iran. At the 2006 census, its population was 1,667, in 414 families.

References 

Populated places in Kazerun County